Exorcist Vengeance is a 2022 supernatural horror film directed and produced by Scott Jeffrey and Rebecca Matthews. It stars "Charles Bronson lookalike" Robert Bronzi, alongside Steven Berkoff, Sarah Alexandra Marks, Nicola Wright, Simon Furness, Nicole Nabi, Anna Liddell, and Ben Parsons. Mark L. Lester served as executive producer on the film.

Exorcist Vengeance was released on DVD and video-on-demand (VOD) on February 8, 2022, by Uncork'd Entertainment.

Cast
 Robert Bronzi as Father Jozsef
 Steven Berkoff as Bishop Canelo
 Sarah Alexandra Marks as Rebecca
 Nicola Wright as Christine
 Simon Furness as Patrick
 Nicole Nabi
 Anna Liddell
 Ben Parsons as Nick

Reception
On Rotten Tomatoes, the film has an approval rating of 0% based on five reviews.

Andrew Stover of Film Threat gave the film a score of 5 out of 10, writing that its "uneven tone and underdeveloped suspense prevent the supernatural horror mystery from reaching success" although did praise the score for "sustaining some much-needed suspense" while there is a "unique family dynamic" in the acting. Kelly Vance, writing for the East Bay Express, called the film "insultingly stupid", and unfavorably compared Bronzi's performance to that of "Tommy Wiseau, star of the midnight-movie favorite The Room."

References

External links
 
 

2022 horror films
2020s supernatural horror films
American supernatural horror films
Demons in film
Films about exorcism
2020s English-language films
2020s American films